Angelo Cesi (19 November 1592 – 20 September 1646) was a Roman Catholic prelate who served as Bishop of Rimini (1627–1646) and Apostolic Nuncio to Venice (1645–1646).

Biography
Angelo Cesi was born in Rome, Italy on 19 November 1592.
On 19 July 1627, he was appointed during the papacy of Pope Urban VIII as Bishop of Rimini.
On 1 August 1627, he was consecrated bishop by Luigi Caetani, Cardinal-Priest of Santa Pudenziana, Giuseppe Acquaviva, Titular Archbishop of Thebae, and Pietro Francesco Montorio, Bishop Emeritus of Nicastro, serving as co-consecrators. 
On 2 March 1645, he was appointed during the papacy of Pope Innocent X as Apostolic Nuncio to Venice.
He served as Bishop of Rimini and Apostolic Nuncio to Venice until his death on 20 September 1646.

Episcopal succession
While bishop, he was the principal co-consecrator of:

See also 
Catholic Church in Italy

References

External links and additional sources
 (for Chronology of Bishops) 
 (for Chronology of Bishops) 
 (for Chronology of Bishops)  

17th-century Italian Roman Catholic bishops
Bishops appointed by Pope Urban VIII
Bishops appointed by Pope Innocent X
1592 births
1646 deaths
Apostolic Nuncios to the Republic of Venice
Bishops of Rimini